This is the electoral history of Ed Markey, a Democratic Senator from Massachusetts. He was previously a Democratic Representative from Massachusetts, representing the 7th and 5th districts. Markey was first elected in a 1976 special election to replace the deceased Torbert Macdonald, and was re-elected in every subsequent election. He was also the Democratic candidate, and winner, of the 2013 special election, for the United States Senate.

Massachusetts House of Representatives

United States House of Representatives

|+ : Results 1976–2010
! Year
!
! Democrat
! Votes
! %
!
! Republican
! Votes
! %
!
! Third Party
! Party
! Votes
! %
!
! Third Party
! Party
! Votes
! %
!
|-
|1976
||
| |Edward Markey
| |162,126
| |77%
|
| |Richard Daly
| |37,063
| |18%
|
| |James Murphy
| |Independent
| align="right" |6,851
| align="right" |3%
|
| |Harry Chickles
| |Independent
| align="right" |4,748
| align="right" |2%
|
|-
|1978
||
| |Edward Markey
| |145,615
| |85%
|
| |No candidate
| |
| |
|
| |James Murphy
| |Independent
| align="right" |26,017
| align="right" |15%
|
|
|
|
|
|
|-
|1980
||
| |Edward Markey
| |155,759
| |100%
|
| |No candidate
| |
| |
|
|
|
|
|
|
|
|
|
|
|
|-
|1982
||
| |Edward Markey
| |151,305
| |78%
|
| |David Basile
| |43,063
| |22%
|
|
|
|
|
|
|
|
|
|
|
|-
|1984
||
| |Edward Markey
| |167,211
| |71%
|
| |S. Lester Ralph
| |66,930
| |29%
|
|
|
|
|
|
|
|
|
|
|
|-
|1986
||
| |Edward Markey
| |124,183
| |100%
|
| |No candidate
| |
| |
|
|
|
|
|
|
|
|
|
|
|
|-
|1988
||
| |Edward Markey
| |188,647
| |100%
|
| |No candidate
| |
| |
|
|
|
|
|
|
|
|
|
|
|
|-
|1990
||
| |Edward Markey
| |155,380
| |100%
|
| |No candidate
| |
| |
|
|
|
|
|
|
|
|
|
|
|
|-
|1992
||
| |Edward Markey
| |174,837 
| |62%
|
| |Stephen Sohn
| |78,262
| |28%
|
| |Robert Antonelli
| |Independent
| align="right" |28,421 
| align="right" |10%
|
|
|
|
|
|
|-
|1994
||
| |Edward Markey
| |146,246
| |64%
|
| |Brad Bailey
| |80,674 
| |36%
|
|
|
|
|
|
|
|
|
|
|
|-
|1996
||
| |Edward Markey
| |177,053
| |70%
|
| |Patricia Long
| |76,407
| |30%
|
|
|
|
|
|
|
|
|
|
|
|-
|1998
||
| |Edward Markey
| |137,178
| |71%
|
| |Patricia Long
| |56,977 
| |29%
|
|
|
|
|
|
|
|
|
|
|
|-
|2000
||
| |Edward Markey
| |211,543
| |99%
|
| |No candidate
| |
| |
|
| |Other
| |
| |2,814
| |1%
|
|
|
|
|
|
|-
|2002
||
| |Edward Markey
| |170,968 
| |98%
|
| |No candidate
| |
| |
|
| |Other
| |
| |2,206
| |1%
|
| |Daniel Melnechuk
| |write-in
| |863
| |0%
|
|-
|2004
||
| |Edward Markey
| |202,399
| |74%
|
| |Kenneth Chase
| |60,334 
| |22%
|
| |James Hall
| |Independent
| |12,139
| |4%
|
|
|
|
|
|
|-
|2006
||
| |Edward Markey
| |171,902
| |98%
|
| |No candidate
| |
| |
|
| |Other
| |
| |2,889
| |2%
|
|
|
|
|
|
|-
|2008
||
| |Edward Markey
| |212,304
| |76%
|
| |John Cunningham
| |81,802
| |24%
|
|
|
|
|
|
|
|
|
|
|
|-
|2010
||
| |Edward Markey
| |145,696
| |66%
|
| |Gerry Dembrowski
| |73,467
| |33%
|
|
|
|
|
|
|
|
|
|
|

|+ : Results 2012
! Year
!
! Democrat
! Votes
! %
!
! Republican
! Votes
! %
!
! Third Party
! Party
! Votes
! %
!
|-
|2012
||
| |Ed Markey
| |257,490
| |75%
|
| |Tom Tierney
| |82,944
| |24%
|
| |Other
| |
| |675
| |0%

United States Senate

2013 Special Election

2014

thumb|right|200px|Results by county, 2014

2020

References

Markey, Ed
Massachusetts elections